(John) Trevor Stuart FRS (born 29 January 1929) is a mathematician and senior research investigator at Imperial College London working in theoretical fluid mechanics, hydrodynamic stability of fluid flows and nonlinear partial differential equations.

Education
Stuart was educated Gateway Grammar School, Leicester and Imperial College of Science and Technology, London where he was awarded a Bachelor of Science degree in 1949 and a PhD in 1953.

Career
Stuart joined the Aeronautics Division of the National Research Laboratory, returning to join the staff of Imperial College after a few years. He was appointed professor of theoretical fluid mechanics in 1966 and was head of the Department of Mathematics from 1974 to 1979 and 1983 to 1986. He was Dean of the Royal College of Science from 1990 to 1993. He is currently emeritus professor at Imperial.

Research
Stuart is known for his work on nonlinear waves in the onset of turbulence in fluids. He also extended the work of Lord Rayleigh with research into steady streaming in unsteady viscous flows at high Reynolds numbers.

Awards
Stuart was elected a Fellow of the Royal Society in 1974 and awarded the Otto Laporte Award in 1985 and the Senior Whitehead Prize in 1984. He also holds honorary Doctor of Science degrees from Brown University and the University of East Anglia. He is current editor of the Biographical Memoirs of Fellows of the Royal Society.

References

1929 births
Living people
20th-century British mathematicians
21st-century British mathematicians
Fellows of the Royal Society
Fluid dynamicists
Deans of the Royal College of Science